Kamal Shahr (also Romanized as Kamāl Shahr; also known as Kamalabad (Persian: كَمال آباد), also Romanized as Kamālābād) is one of the five cities in the Central District of Karaj County, Alborz province, Iran. At the 2006 census, its population was 80,435 in 20,940 households. The latest census in 2016 counted 141,669 people in 43,171 households.

References 

Karaj County

Cities in Alborz Province

Populated places in Alborz Province

Populated places in Karaj County